Jakobsnes is a village in Sør-Varanger Municipality in Troms og Finnmark county, Norway. Its population in 2005 was 271.

References

Sør-Varanger
Villages in Finnmark
Populated places of Arctic Norway